Enrico Lupetti (born April 30, 1967) is an Italian sprint canoer who competed in the early to mid-1990s. He was eliminated in the semifinals of the K-4 1000 m event at the 1992 Summer Olympics in Barcelona. Four years later in Atlanta, Lupetti was eliminated in the semifinals of the same event.

References
Sports-Reference.com profile

1967 births
Canoeists at the 1992 Summer Olympics
Canoeists at the 1996 Summer Olympics
Italian male canoeists
Living people
Olympic canoeists of Italy